Bruce Croall (born 1978) is a British and Scottish retired track cyclist.

Cycling career
Croall became British champion when winning the time trial Championship at the 2010 British National Track Championships.

He represented Scotland at the 2014 Commonwealth Games finishing in eighth place during the 1,000 metres time trial event.

References

1978 births
Living people
British male cyclists
British track cyclists
Sportspeople from Edinburgh
Scottish track cyclists
Cyclists at the 2014 Commonwealth Games
Commonwealth Games competitors for Scotland